Shuiquliu railway station is a railway station belonging to Lafa–Harbin Railway and located in the Shulan of Jilin, Jilin province, China.

See also
Lafa–Harbin Railway

References

Railway stations in Jilin